Hautzig is a German surname. Notable people with the surname include:

 Deborah Hautzig (born 1956), American author
 Esther Hautzig (1930–2009), American writer
 Walter Hautzig (1921–2017), pianist

German-language surnames